The following is a list of Michigan State Historic Sites in Alger County, Michigan. Sites marked with a dagger (†) are also listed on the National Register of Historic Places in Alger County, Michigan.


Current listings

See also
 National Register of Historic Places listings in Alger County, Michigan

Sources
 Historic Sites Online – Alger County. Michigan State Housing Developmental Authority. Accessed January 23, 2011.

References

Alger County
State Historic Sites
Tourist attractions in Alger County, Michigan